Rolling Papers 2 (sometimes stylized as Rolling Papers II) is the sixth studio album by American rapper Wiz Khalifa. It was released on July 13, 2018 by Taylor Gang and Atlantic Records, and is the sequel to his major-label debut Rolling Papers (2011). The album features guest appearances by Gucci Mane, Swae Lee, Ty Dolla Sign, PartyNextDoor, Bone Thugs-n-Harmony and Snoop Dogg, among others. It also features appearances from upcoming R&B duo THEMXXNLIGHT, as well as Jimmy Wopo, who is credited posthumously following his death on June 18, 2018, less than a month before the album's release. Meanwhile, the production is handled by Cardo, Mike Will Made It, Tay Keith, and Young Chop, among others.

It was supported by the singles "Something New", "Real Rich", "Hopeless Romantic" and "Gin & Drugs". "Something New" and "Hopeless Romantic" were both modest hits, eventually being certified platinum by the RIAA. The album debuted at number 2 on the Billboard 200.

Background
In an episode of Genius' For the Record, Wiz Khalifa sat down with hip hop journalist Rob Markman to speak on the album, stating,

Reception

Rolling Papers 2 was met with generally mixed reviews from critics. At Metacritic, which assigns a normalized rating out of 100 from mainstream publications, the album received an average score of 56, based on 6 reviews.

Commercial performance
In United States, Rolling Papers 2 debuted at number two on the Billboard 200 based on 84.2 million streams of its songs and 14,000 pure album sales, which Billboard equated to 80,000 album-equivalent units. It is Khalifa's fifth top-ten album in the United States. The album earned 33,000 album-equivalent units in the second week. In Canada, the album debuted at number four on the Canadian Albums Chart. It serves as Khalifa's third non-consecutive top-ten album in the country.

In 2018, Rolling Papers 2 was ranked as the 128th most popular album of the year on the Billboard 200. The album was certified Gold by the RIAA 11 months after its release.

Track listing

Charts

Weekly charts

Year-end charts

Certifications

References

2018 albums
Atlantic Records albums
Sequel albums
Wiz Khalifa albums
Albums produced by Cardo
Albums produced by Cubeatz
Albums produced by DJ Khalil
Albums produced by Easy Mo Bee
Albums produced by Frank Dukes
Albums produced by Mike Will Made It
Albums produced by Tay Keith
Albums produced by Terrace Martin
Albums produced by Young Chop
Albums produced by TM88
Albums produced by Hitmaka